Ola Electric Mobility is an Indian electric two-wheeler manufacturer, based in Bengaluru. Its manufacturing plant is located in Krishnagiri, Tamil Nadu, India.

History

2017-2019
Ola Electric was established in 2017 as a wholly-owned subsidiary of ANI Technologies, the parent entity of Ola Cabs. The company was started to reduce emission and fuel dependency of Ola's cabs, and shift to mass electric mobility; a pilot program was launched in Nagpur in May 2017 by setting up charging stations across the city and procuring electric cabs, e-buses, and e-rickshaws from OEM partners. In April 2018, it announced that it aims to have 1 million electric vehicles in its cab service by 2022.

ANI Technologies continued to hold a 7.5% stake in Ola Electric for allowing the use of "Ola" brand name.

In February 2019, Ola Electric raised 56 million from Tiger Global and Matrix India.  The company announced on 6 May 2019 that Ratan Tata had invested an undisclosed amount in Ola Electric as part of its Series A round of funding. It raised $250 million from SoftBank during Series B round funding in July 2019, at a valuation of over $1 billion.

2020-present
Ola Electric acquired Amsterdam-based electric scooter manufacturer Etergo in May 2020 and announced that it would launch its own line of electric scooters in India by 2021.

In December 2020, the company announced its plan to set up an world's largest two wheeler factory (called the Future Factory) in Tamil Nadu at a cost of  after signing a memorandum with the Government of Tamil Nadu. It acquired a 500-acre land in Pochampalli, Krishnagiri District in January 2021; the construction work for the factory began in late February.

Ola Electric received 500,000 bookings for scooters in the first month of availability.

Ola Electric started delivering its S1 and S1 Pro models in December 2021 with the deliveries of 100 scooters in Bengaluru and Chennai, although some promised features were not enabled in initial deliveries.

Ola Electric raised more than $200 million from Falcon Edge, SoftBank Group and others at a valuation of $3 billion in September 2021. In December the same year, it raised $53 million in an investment round led by Singaporean holding company, Temasek. In January 2022, Ola Electric raised 200 million from multiple investors at a valuation of 5 billion.

In late March 2022, Ola made a strategic multi-million-dollar investment in Israel-based battery technologies company StoreDot to incorporate and manufacture its XFC (extreme fast charging) battery technologies for future vehicles in India. In the wake of fire incident in their product in Pune on 26th March, the company recalled a batch of 1441 scooters in April. Claiming it as a pre-emptive measure the company said it will help them investigate further.

On 20 June 2022, Ola Electric teased its first sedan electric car, under development and likely to be launched in 2023. Company’s CEO Bhavish Aggarwal said that more details will be revealed on August 15 this year.

Bhavish Aggarwal announced its upcoming battery innovation center (BIC) in Bangalore, which will be Asia's largest Cell R&D facility.  Bhavesh Aggarwal said that the Battery Innovation Center will include more than 165 pieces of “unique and cutting-edge” ab equipment that will cover every component of a cell, making it one of Asia's largest and most advanced cell research and development (R&D) facilities.

Production
The factory is spread in a 500 acre, fully-automated complex located in Pochampalli town in the Krishnagiri district of Tamil Nadu. The company claimed it will be the largest two wheeler factory in the world with an annual production capacity of 10 million units. The factory, named the Ola Future Factory, produced its first electric two-wheeler on 15 August 2021. By January 2022, it was manufacturing nearly a thousand electric scooters daily.

Products

Ola S1 
Ola S1 was launched on May 27, 2020. The scooter can travel 121 km on one charge. It can attain a top speed of 90kmph. It takes from 5 to 6 hours to recharge the scooter.

Ola S1 Pro 
Ola S1 Pro was launched on August 15,2022  with one variant and 11 colours. According to the company, the highest speed will be 115 kmph, and the ARAI certified range will be 181 kilometers on a full charge, compared to 90 km and 121 km for the standard model. It takes from 5 to 6 hours to charge the scooter.

Ola S1 Air 
The Ola S1 Air was launched as the most affordable electric scooter with an 85K price range. The new Ola S1 Air will be an upgrade to its existing S1 model. Ola S1 Air will have a ARAI range of 100km and can accelerate from 0 to 40 km in 4.3 seconds. It comes with a battery of 2.5Kwh and a 7-inch touchscreen. The upgraded version offers its customers a flat footboard, a hub motor, a rear swing arm, front telescopic suspension, and rear dual suspension in place of horizontal mono suspension, redesigned grab rail, dual tone colours, and a lighter body.

See also
 Ather Energy
 Okinawa Autotech
 Gogoro
 Electric vehicle industry in India

References

External links
 

Vehicle manufacturing companies established in 2017
Scooter manufacturers
Motor scooters
Indian motor scooters
Electric scooters
Electric vehicle infrastructure developers
Electric vehicle battery manufacturers
Electric vehicle manufacturers of India
Battery electric vehicle manufacturers
Electric vehicle industry